Schmidinger is a surname. Notable people with the surname include:

Gregor Schmidinger (born 1985), Austrian screenwriter and director
Krista Schmidinger (born 1970), American alpine skier
Walter Schmidinger (1933–2013), Austrian actor

See also
Schmidiger